Tammiste may refer to several places in Estonia:

Tammiste, Pärnu County, village in Tori Parish, Pärnu County
Tammiste, Tartu County, village in Elva Parish, Tartu County